Isaac Chocrón Serfaty (Maracay, September 25, 1930 – Caracas, November 6, 2011) was a Venezuelan economist, playwright and translator.  He was a graduate of Columbia University and Manchester University.  He later directed the School of Arts at the Central University of Venezuela.

See also
List of Venezuelan writers
Venezuelan literature

External links
Obituary (in Spanish)

1930 births
2011 deaths
20th-century Moroccan Jews
Venezuelan people of Moroccan-Jewish descent
Venezuelan dramatists and playwrights
Venezuelan translators
People from Maracay
Columbia University alumni
Academic staff of the Central University of Venezuela
20th-century dramatists and playwrights
20th-century translators
Male dramatists and playwrights
20th-century male writers